Amanuel Gebremichael Aregwai (born 5 February 1999) is an Ethiopian professional footballer who plays as a forward for Ethiopian Premier League club Saint George and the Ethiopia national team.

Club career
Mekelle 70 Enderta finished second in their group in the Ethiopian Higher League in 2016–17, and Gebremichael scored a goal in their victory over Hadiya Hossana in the promotion playoff game to earn the club's first-ever promotion to the Ethiopian Premier League.

On the final matchday of the 2018–19 season, he scored the winning goal in a 2–1 victory over Dire Dawa Kenema that put them one point ahead of Sidama Coffee, securing their first-ever title. He also finished the year with a league-best 17 goals. He scored two goals against Cano Sport, one in each leg, in their 2019–20 CAF Champions League preliminary qualifying matchup, but they still lost by an aggregate scoreline of 3–2.

International career
Gebremichael made his senior international debut on 5 December 2017, coming on for Dawa Hotessa during their 3–0 win over South Sudan in the 2017 CECAFA Cup. He earned his second cap the following year in a loss to Ghana during 2019 Africa Cup of Nations qualification, and scored his maiden international goal in his fourth cap against Djibouti on 4 August 2019 during 2020 African Nations Championship qualification.

He scored in his debut with the national under-23 team, a 4–0 defeat of Somalia at home in the first round of 2019 Africa U-23 Cup of Nations qualification.

Career statistics 

Scores and results list Ethiopia's goal tally first, score column indicates score after each Gebremichael goal.

Honours
Mekelle 70 Enderta
 Ethiopian Premier League: 2018–19

Individual
 Ethiopian Premier League top scorer: 2018–19

References

External links
 
 
 

Living people
1999 births
Ethiopian footballers
Ethiopia international footballers
Sportspeople from Gambela Region
Association football forwards
Mekelle 70 Enderta F.C. players
Saint George S.C. players
Ethiopian Premier League players
2021 Africa Cup of Nations players
Ethiopia A' international footballers
2022 African Nations Championship players